A kalis is a type of double-edged Filipino sword.

Kalis may also refer to:

Places
Kalis, Albania
Kalis, Poland, in Warmian-Masurian Voivodeship
Kaliś, Poland, in Lesser Poland Voivodeship

Other uses
Kalis (surname), including a list of people with the name
Kalis language

See also

Kali (disambiguation)